Dm and Dm3 is a series of locomotives used by Swedish State Railways and later Malmtafik i Kiruna (MTAS) for pulling iron ore trains on the Iron Ore Line in Sweden and Ofoten Line in Norway. A total of 39 double-locomotives (Dm) were delivered between 1954 and 1971, built by ASEA. A further 19 center locomotives (Dm3) were later delivered. Norwegian State Railways also operated 12 similar locomotives, designated NSB El 12. The Dm is a articulated, freight-optimized version of the Da-locomotive.

History
The iron ore trains on the Iron Ore Line between Luleå in Sweden and Narvik in Norway were originally operated by the Of class locomotives, based on the earlier O-series locomotives first used on the line from 1914. In order to replace these locomotives, SJ chose to order new locomotives for the Iron Ore Railway based on the new Da class locomotives being ordered at the time. An initial twenty-four twin-section locomotives, designated the Dm class, were ordered and delivered in 1953, with a further fifteen fitted with new, more powerful motors, delivered in the 1960s. As a result of this, four locomotives from the first batch were fitted with the more powerful motors to match.

As initially developed, the twin-section Dm class locomotives were capable of pulling 3,400 tonne trains. However, due to progressive increases in train size and weight this was no longer acceptable by the end of the 1960s, and so SJ ordered 19 new cabless centre locomotives, which were installed permanently between the two halves of a Dm class locomotive; the resulting rebuild being classed as Dm3. Due to the addition of the centre locomotive, the Dm3 class locomotives were able to haul trains up to 5,400 tonnes. Around the same time, the locomotive cabs were modernised with new, rationalised control layouts and additional noise insulation. Rather than copy its neighbour, the Norwegian State Railway chose to build a different and more powerful locomotive, the NSB El 15 to modernise its operations around the same time.

In the 1980s, the majority of the remaining Dm class locomotives were moved to other locations on the SJ network, leaving the Dm3 class locomotives to operate the Iron Ore Line. All of the Dm3 and several Dm class units passed with the Iron Ore Line to the private company MTAB in 1996, with the remaining Dm class units being reclassified Dm2. With further increases in train size, MTAB decided to order new locomotives to replace the older Dm2 and Dm3 units. With the arrival of the first new IORE locomotives in 2000, the entire Dm2 class were removed from service along with several Dm3 class locomotives. In 2004 one set was donated to the heritage society Malmbanans Vänner, who also own one of the similar-design Norwegian El 12 class locomotives as used on the Iron Ore Railway. MTAB have since agreed that the remaining Dm3 class locomotives will be retired in 2011, when enough IORE locomotives are available to relieve them.

Table 
All MTAB locomotives are named after one of the mines of the LKAB.

External links

 Järnväg.net page on Dm/Dm3 
 Spec Sheet 

ASEA locomotives
Dm3
15 kV AC locomotives
Iron Ore Line
Railway locomotives introduced in 1953
Standard gauge locomotives of Sweden
1′D+D1′ locomotives